Bromley & Beckenham Hockey Club is a field hockey club based at Foxgrove Road, Beckenham. It is a combination of two former London clubs Bromley and Beckenham. The club plays the majority of its fixtures at Langley Park School for Girls in Beckenham. In addition the hockey pitches at Langley Park School for Boys, Bromley School in Bickley,  the HSBC Sports Club and Trinity School in Croydon are also used.

The club runs nine men's senior teams, six women's teams and junior teams. The men's first X1 play in the Men's South Hockey League Premier Division 1. The women's first X1 play in the East Hockey League Premier Division.

Bromley Hockey Club & Beckenham Hockey Club merged after the 2004–05 season.

Major Honours
National Cup as Beckenham
 1976-77 Men's Cup Runner-Up

National Cup as Bromley
 1988-89 Men's Cup Runner-Up

International players past and present
B G Griffiths - Beckenham & Wales
Alan Graham Page - Beckenham, England & GB
Roger Macklin Sutton - Beckenham, Wales & GB
Paul Joseph Thomas Svehlik - Beckenham, England & GB

References

English field hockey clubs